The F-1 (from "First Physical Reactor") is a research reactor operated by the Kurchatov Institute in Moscow, Russia.  When started on December 25, 1946, it became the first nuclear reactor in Europe to achieve a self-sustaining nuclear chain reaction. It was still in operation in the beginning of the 2010s, with a power level of 24 kW, making it, at that time, the world's oldest operating reactor. The fuel in F-1 is metallic uranium with the natural content of the 235 U isotope (0.72%), graphite as a moderator, and cadmium rods to control the neutron flux. Structurally, it is a spherical structure with a diameter of about 6 meters, made of loose graphite bricks. The graphite stack has holes in which fuel and control rods are placed, as well as research and control equipment. The weight of graphite is 400 tons, uranium is 50 tons.

Thermal power of the reactor is from 100 W to 1 MW. Air cooling, if necessary, was provided by fans. Long-term operation at high power was not possible, but the large mass of the core allowed a short-term increase in power to peak values. In November 2016 it was in permanent shutdown state.

See also 
 Chicago Pile-1

References

External links 
 Research Reactor Details - F-1 Nuclear Research Reactors in the World
 Two photos of F-1

Nuclear power in Russia
Graphite moderated reactors
Nuclear power stations built in the Soviet Union